The knockout stage of the 2012–13 LEN Champions League began on 9 March 2013 and will conclude on 1 June 2013 with the final at Tašmajdan Sports Centre in Belgrade, Serbia.

Times up to 30 March 2013 (eight finals) are UTC+1, thereafter (quarter finals and final four) times are UTC+2.

Round and draw dates
All draws are held in Rome, Italy.

Qualified teams

Eight Finals
The draw was held on 28 February 2013 in Rome, Italy. The first legs were played on 9–10 March, and the second legs were played on 20–21 March 2013.

|}

First leg

Second leg

Jug Dubrovnik won 36–8 on aggregate.

Galatasaray won 20–17 on aggregate.

Spartak Volgograd won 21–19 on aggregate.

Crvena Zvezda won 21–14 on aggregate.

Partizan won 16–11 on aggregate.

Vouliagmeni won 26–25 on aggregate.

Atlètic-Barceloneta won 27–13 on aggregate.

Szeged won 27–13 on aggregate.

Quarter finals

The draw was held on 25 March 2013 in Rome, Italy. The first legs were played on 17 April, and the second legs were played on 1 May 2013.

|}

First leg

References

External links
Official website

2012–13 LEN Champions League